The USA International is an international badminton tournament held in United States since 1998. This tournament formerly known as Miami PanAm International or Southern PanAm Classic and belongs to Badminton Pan Am.

Previous winners

References

External links 
sbabadminton.org
mbbadmintonclub.com

Badminton tournaments in the United States
International sports competitions hosted by the United States
Recurring sporting events established in 1998
Recurring sporting events disestablished in 2016
Sports competitions in Miami
1998 establishments in Florida
2016 disestablishments in the United States